The term customer information system may refer to:

a system for managing information about customers in the context of a business's relationship to those customers, often called a customer relationship management system
a system for providing information to customers of a transport system, often called a passenger information system